Genesis 1976–1982 is a box set of five studio albums by Genesis. It was released on 2 April 2007 in Europe & Japan by Virgin/EMI and on 15 May 2007 in North America by Atlantic/Rhino. The 6-CD/6-DVD box set includes newly remixed versions of the albums A Trick of the Tail, Wind & Wuthering, ...And Then There Were Three..., Duke, and Abacab. The sixth pair of discs includes B-side songs.

Each CD also has an associated DVD which features audio versions of the albums in 5.1 surround sound, as well as videos for songs from that album or tour, new interviews and photo galleries.

Audio formats
In November 2006 Banks, Rutherford, and Collins announced they were reforming Genesis for the 2007 Turn It On Again Tour. The announcement coincided with the release of three box sets containing digital remasters of the band's studio output across 2007 by EMI Records, containing new stereo and 5.1 surround sound mixes by producer and engineer Nick Davis.

In the European and Japanese releases of this box set, the CDs are hybrid SACD/CDs. The SACD layer is a multichannel surround sound remix.

In the Canadian and U.S. releases of this box set, standard CDs with no SACD layer are included.

In all versions of the box set, the DVDs are DVD-Video format (not DVD-Audio), although they contain both audio and video tracks. These DVDs include three audio mixes:  DTS 5.1-channel surround sound, Dolby Digital 5.1-channel surround sound, and Dolby Digital stereo. The DTS surround sound is a slightly compressed version of the surround sound on the SACDs, and the Dolby surround sound is a slightly inferior quality to the DTS.

In November 2012, a 6LP Vinyl Boxset was issued in the United Kingdom.  It features the 2007 remasters on 180g platters.

All of the audio tracks on these CDs were remixed in stereo and surround sound by producer Nick Davis, with the sole exception of "Say It's Alright Joe", which was not remixed because the band was unable to locate the multitrack recordings.

Track listing

A Trick of the Tail

CD

DVD

Wind & Wuthering

CD

DVD

...And Then There Were Three...

CD

DVD

Duke

CD

DVD

Abacab

CD

DVD

Extra Tracks 1976 to 1982

CD

DVD

Personnel
Tony Banks – keyboards, backing vocals
Phil Collins – drums, percussion, lead and backing vocals
Mike Rutherford – guitars, bass
Steve Hackett – guitars on A Trick of the Tail, Wind & Wuthering, and tracks 3, 6, 9, 10 on CD 6

Additional personnel

David Hentschel – Backing vocals on Duke
EWF Horns – horns on "No Reply at All" and "Paperlate"

Formats
UK/EU Version:  CD/SACD hybrid + DVD (PAL)
US/Canadian Version: CD + DVD (NTSC)
Japanese Version:  CD/SACD hybrid + DVD (NTSC)

References

Albums produced by David Hentschel
Genesis (band) compilation albums
Genesis (band) video albums
2007 compilation albums